David Vere-Jones (born in 1936 in England) is a New Zealand statistician and probabilist.  He is known in particular for his work on earthquake forecasting.

Career 
David Vere-Jones obtained his doctorate in 1962 at Oxford University under the supervision of David George Kendall, with a thesis entitled "Topics in the Theory of Probability".

He worked from 1962 to 1964 at the Laboratory of Applied Mathematics of the Ministry of Scientific and Industrial Research (DSIR). From 1965 to 1969 he worked in the Department of Statistics, Institute of Advanced Studies, at the Australian National University in Canberra. From 1970 to 2000 he was professor of mathematics at the Victoria University of Wellington in New Zealand. He then retired and founded a company,  Statistics Research Associates Limited, of which he was a director until 2009. Vere-Jones founded the Mathematical Society of New Zealand in 1974 and was its first president.

Prizes and distinctions 
In 1982, Vere-Jones was elected a fellow of the Royal Society of New Zealand. In 1995 he received the Henri Willem Methorst medal from the International Statistical Institute. In 1999, he was awarded the New Zealand Science and Technology Gold Medal. In 2014, he received the Royal Society of New Zealand's Jones Medal "For his work in statistics, both his groundbreaking work on earthquake forecasting and his contribution to the teaching of statistics and mathematics in New Zealand".

References 

1936 births
Living people
Vere-jones
Victoria University of Wellington alumni
Alumni of the University of Oxford
Academic staff of the Australian National University
Academic staff of the Victoria University of Wellington
Fellows of the Royal Society of New Zealand
Recipients of the Rutherford Medal